William Terrence Orban (born February 20, 1944) is a Canadian former professional ice hockey forward who played 114 games in the National Hockey League for the Chicago Black Hawks and Minnesota North Stars.

External links

1944 births
Living people
Canadian ice hockey forwards
Chicago Blackhawks players
Ice hockey people from Saskatchewan
Minnesota North Stars players
Sportspeople from Regina, Saskatchewan